The pool stage of the 2022–23 EPCR Challenge Cup was the first stage of the eighth season of the EPCR Challenge Cup. The competition will consist of two pools, one with ten teams and one with eight. The six highest-ranked clubs from each pool will be joined by the two clubs ranked nine and ten from each of the Champions Cup pools, in the Round of 16. The pool stage began on 9 December 2022 and will be completed on 22 January 2023.

Pool stage
The teams were allocated into two pools depending on where they finished in their respective leagues in the previous season.

Teams in the same pool played two other teams twice, at home and away, in the group stage. The top six from each pool to the last 16 where they will be joined by the 9th and 10th placed team in each pool of the 2022–23 European Rugby Champions Cup.

Teams were awarded four points for a win, two for a draw, one for scoring four tries in a game, and one for losing by less than eight points.

In the event of a tie between two or more teams, the following tie-breakers will be used, as directed by EPCR:
 Where teams have played each other
 The club with the greater number of competition points from only matches involving tied teams.
 If equal, the club with the best aggregate points difference from those matches.
 If equal, the club that scored the most tries in those matches.
 Where teams remain tied and/or have not played each other in the competition (i.e. are from different pools)
 The club with the best aggregate points difference from the pool stage.
 If equal, the club that scored the most tries in the pool stage.
 If equal, the club with the fewest players suspended in the pool stage.
 If equal, the drawing of lots will determine a club's ranking.

Pool A

Round 1

Round 2

Round 3

Round 4

Pool B

Round 1

Round 2

Round 3

Round 4

Notes

References

EPCR Challenge Cup pool stages
2022–23 EPCR Challenge Cup